Leptachatina lepida is a species of small air-breathing land snails, terrestrial pulmonate gastropod mollusks in the family Amastridae. This species is endemic to the United States.

References

Fauna of the United States
Leptachatina
Gastropods described in 1910
Taxonomy articles created by Polbot